Modicon can mean:

 Modicon PLC, the first programmable logic controller
 Ethinylestradiol/norethisterone, an oral contraceptive formulation